The 3000 Club started as a  Phoenix-based charity which works with food banks in Arizona in order to reduce food waste. The 3000 Club's main program is known as Market on the Move, although the organization provides other services for Arizona communities. Their previous mission statement "Providing life saving fresh fruits and vegetables to impoverished families" has been changed to "nothing useful should end up in a landfill."

Goals are aimed at improving the community, such as preventing 30,000,000 pounds of fresh fruits and vegetables from being wasted each year, refurbishing computers and electronics for educational use, redistributing useful medical supplies into 3rd world countries, working with same-minded organizations who believe there is too much waste.

History 

Founder of the organization, Lon Taylor, found a need for funding the continuation of a Nogales food bank. Ethel Luzario, an original member of the entrepreneurial community, joined the organization and expanded it to promote satellite food-banks. In February 2008, medical reclamation was added to the composition of the non-profit. This was initiated by a movement created by Lon and Ethel after their visit to the Philippines. With the opening of a Tucson warehouse, a working partnership now exists between the Southwest Medical Aid in Tucson, Arizona and the 3000 Club. This resulted in the redistribution of 2 million dollars in supplies in the summer of 2008. In 2010, partnering with local churches and other non-profits, Market on the Move was created. As of October 2014, the 3000 Club became unaffiliated with the Nogales food bank, in support of the Nogales Community Food Bank.

Market On the Move (MOM) 

Market on the Move is the flagship enterprise of the 3000 Club. It consists of satellite sites throughout Arizona, including Tucson, Phoenix, Flagstaff, Prescott, Casa Grande, and Surprise. The venue will vary but usually exists in parking lots of churches, banks, schools, parks, and other well-trafficked areas. The premise of MOM is to distribute unused produce to those in need and to stop the produce from being dumped in a landfill, specifically the Rio Rico landfill. This includes up to 60 lbs of food for a donation of $10, on a suggestion "donate what you can" basis. MOM encourages the participants to share this produce with friends, neighbors, family members and local organizations. This produce sharing also goes towards environmental concerns in that produce waste is one of the main causes of methane gas being released into the atmosphere. These pick-up sites are open Saturdays and Wednesdays during the majority of the year. Signage guides visitors to the specific temporary set-up location. The rotating sites create a farmers market style. The market provides primarily vegetables, although fruits, citrus (seasonally) and melons are occasionally available.

MOMers shop for a cause and MOMer's Corner 
This permanent thrift store continues the mission of the 3000 Club in its commitment to reclaiming goods and providing easy access to those in need.  Items available and accepted as donations are: clothing, footwear, household appliances, electronics and computers/laptops/printers/monitors/anything that plugs into an electrical socket, tools, both electric and manual. The store is open 6 days a week, Monday-Friday: 9am-4pm, and Saturday during Market On the Move. They are located in Tucson, Arizona.

Disaster Relief 
The 3000 club accepts donations of any items such as clothing, household cleaning and utility items, dry and canned foods, and toiletries. These items go towards the aid of victims of any disasters, natural or otherwise, and to better prepare and collaborate with relief efforts.

The Salvation Army and Team Up for Tucson also offer donation opportunities locally.

American Medical Aid Program 

The American Medical Aid Program (The 3000 Club Medical Reclamation Project) has been working since 2008 to redistribute medical supplies and equipment to people in need. Supplies are distributed to people in local, national, and global communities. In addition, the program travels to other countries with a team of volunteers in order to provide medical service and supplies to populations in critical need.

Blanket Program 
One of the 3000 Club's program is the "Blanket Program". They focus on providing blankets to both homeless veterans and homeless shelters. The 3000 Club partners with numerous organizations to distribute donated blankets to the over 45,000 homeless veterans and civilians currently in America. The program includes an option of donating $3 to supply a blanket to those in need. In donating a blanket the organization stresses the importance of it being more than just a material good that provides warmth and comfort, but one that creates a livable sleeping arrangement.

Computer Refurbishing Program 
The 3000 Club also refurbishes donated computers, appliances, and other goods in order to reduce waste and provide affordable electronics for the Tucson Community. Students from 5th through 12th grade on the Arizona Free Lunch program qualify for reduced prices on the program's goods.

See also

 List of food banks

References

External links

Food and the environment
Food banks in Arizona
Organizations based in Phoenix, Arizona
Organizations established in 2008
2008 establishments in Arizona
Organizations based in Tucson, Arizona